Erminio Rullo (born 19 February 1984) is an Italian footballer who plays for Olympia Agnonese as a centre back.

Club career

Lecce
Born in Naples, Campania, Rullo started his career with Apulia side Lecce. He archived a record by winning three consecutive Campionato Nazionale Primavera between 2002 and 2004, two with Lecce and one with F.C. Internazionale Milano Primavera.

In June 2001 half of the registration rights of Rullo was acquired by Internazionale for 3,000 million lire (€1,549,371); At the same time half of the "card" of Giorgio Frezzolini was sold to Lecce for 2,500 million lire (€1,291,142), as well as half the "card" of Bruno Cirillo for 6,000 million lire. (€3,098,741) Rullo signed a 4-year contract. Rullo spent a season in Inter's reserve. He also sometimes featured as wing forward as the team had Giovanni Pasquale. In June 2002 Frezzolini joined Lecce for free, as well as Cirillo to Lecce for €306,000 and Rullo returned to Lecce for €151,000. The club failed to agree a price, through a mandatory bidding process, Lecce acquired Cirillo and Rullo.

Rullo made his Serie A debut on 31 August 2003 against Lazio, the opening match of 2003–04 Serie A.  He was substituted by Alessandro Budel at half time as the team already lost 0–3 away at that time. He started 4 more Serie A matches that season, 

In 2004–05 Serie A, Rullo ahead Abruzzese at the left back position, under new coach Zdeněk Zeman who replaced Delio Rossi. The team now featured only one right winger, Marco Cassetti, instead of 2 or even 3 in the last season, which also saw the departure of Tonetto.

Rullo followed Lecce relegated to Serie B in mid-2006.

Napoli
In January 2007 he left for fellow Serie B side Napoli for €1.5 million and Lecce signed Alberto Giuliatto from Treviso as replacement. Rullo signed a -year contract. Rullo worked as understudy of Mirko Savini that season and finished as runner-up and promoted to Serie A.

With Napoli at Serie A, Rullo remained as Savini's backup, despite wore no.3 shirt. On 26 June 2008 he was loaned to Serie B side Triestina. Napoli later signed Salvatore Aronica to feature as the new left central back or youth product Luigi Vitale (2ho took the no.3 shirt) as left wingback ahead Savini.

With Triestina, Rullo made 34 started out of possible 42 Serie B matches. In 2009–10 season, he returned to Napoli, and changed his shirt number to no.33 But Rullo remained as a backup player, which Roberto Donadoni and then Walter Mazzarri preferred Aronica (as left central back, left back or left wingback), Juan Camilo Zúñiga (left wingback, summer new signing) and Andrea Dossena (left wingback, winter new signing).

At the start of 2010–11 season, Napoli included Aronica, Dossena, Rullo and Zúñiga in the 25-men squad for 2010–11 UEFA Europa League qualifying (with several players left out), which also saw Rullo's shirt number changed again, this time to no.84 – the year of his birth (Matteo Gianello took his number). However, he did not receive a call-up to that qualifying match.

Modena
Rullo moved to Modena on 10 January 2011 on a free transfer.

References

External links
 Profile at Lega-Calcio.it 
 La Gazzetta dello Sport (2006–07 season) 
 FIGC National Team data 
 Football.it Profile 
 
 

Italian footballers
Italy under-21 international footballers
Italy youth international footballers
Serie A players
Serie B players
Serie C players
U.S. Lecce players
Inter Milan players
S.S.C. Napoli players
U.S. Triestina Calcio 1918 players
Modena F.C. players
Association football wingers
Association football fullbacks
Footballers from Naples
1984 births
Living people